ZipRecruiter is an American employment marketplace for job seekers and employers.

The company is headquartered in Santa Monica, California with offices in Tempe, AZ; London, UK and Tel Aviv, Israel.

History
ZipRecruiter was founded in 2010 by Ian Siegel, Joe Edmonds, Ward Poulos and Will Redd.

In June 2015 as the company began growing, they opened an R&D center in Israel and in 2018, claimed to have developed an artificial intelligence algorithm to increase the accuracy of job seeker/employer matches.

In 2017, Facebook also partnered with the company and integrated ZipRecruiter into its platform.

In 2018, the company reported that over 1.5 million businesses and 430 million job seekers used its platform.

In December 2018, the company's users' names and email addresses were exposed in a data breach. ZipRecruiter claimed that they were able to fix it within 90 minutes after the technical glitch was reported.

In March 2019, ZipRecruiter began operating in Canada.

In April 2021, the company filed for a Direct Listing. The company went public on May 26, 2021.

In September 2021, ZipRecruiter signed a one-year deal with UFC for a "low seven-figure fee".

Funding
ZipRecruiter delayed raising venture capital until 2014, when the company's first round of financing of $63 million was led by IVP.

In October 2018, the company raised $156 million for its online employment marketplace, which brought its total funding to $219 million. Blake Irving, Cipora Herman, and Emilie Choi were added as new members to its board.  The October 2018 raise was at a valuation of $1 billion.

References

Business services companies established in 2010
Internet properties established in 2010
Employment websites in the United States
Online marketplaces of the United States
Companies based in Santa Monica, California
Companies listed on the New York Stock Exchange
2010 establishments in California
Professional networks
Direct stock offerings